The 2010 Riviera di Rimini Challenger was a professional tennis tournament played on outdoor red clay courts. It was the seventh edition of the tournament which was part of the 2010 ATP Challenger Tour. It took place in Rimini, Italy between 12 July and 18 July 2010.

ATP entrants

Seeds

 Rankings are as of July 5, 2010.

Other entrants
The following players received wildcards into the singles main draw:
  Flavio Cipolla
  Federico Gaio
  Alessandro Giannessi
  Daniele Giorgini

The following players received entry from the qualifying draw:
  Pedro Clar-Rosselló
  Stefano Galvani
  Gianluca Naso
  Nicolas Renavand (as a Lucky Loser)
  Walter Trusendi
  Herbert Wiltschnig (as a Lucky Loser)

Champions

Singles

 Paolo Lorenzi def.  Federico del Bonis, 6–2, 6–0

Doubles

 Giulio Di Meo /  Adrian Ungur def.  Juan Pablo Brzezicki /  Alexander Peya, 7–6(6), 3–6, [10–7]

References
Official website

Riviera di Rimini Challenger
Clay court tennis tournaments
Riviera di Rimini Challenger